John Brown (1830–1922) was a British theologian, historian, and pastor.

Brown obtained a Bachelor of Arts and a Doctor of Divinity and served as pastor of Bunyan Meeting in the town of Bedford, Bedfordshire in the Eastern part of England. He was the author of several oft referenced works on church history and theology, including an important biography of John Bunyan, subtitled His Life, Times and Work.

Personal life
Brown married Ada Haydon Ford (1837–1929) in 1859. Their children included Walter Langdon-Brown, the physician and  professor of medicine; and Florence Ada Brown, a political activist combating poverty and eventual mayor of Cambridge, England. He is the grandfather of John Maynard Keynes.

Works
As Author
 Puritan Preaching in England: A Study of Past and Present
 John Bunyan: His Life, Times and Work
 The Pilgrim Fathers of New England and Their Puritan Successors.  Reprinted 1970 by Pilgrim Publications, Pasadena, Texas 77501.
 The History of The English Bible
 The Stundists (1893), digitized
 The Colonial Missions of Congregationalism : The Story of 70 Years (London, 1908). Quoted in "How Bunyan Became English" Isabel Hofmeyr, note 102 p. 105 https://www.jstor.org/stable/3070763

As Editor
 Life and Death of Mr. Badman and The Holy War by John Bunyan (1905)
 The Sermons of Thomas Adams: The Shakespeare of Puritan Theologians; A Selection

References

External links

 
 

English religious writers
19th-century English historians
English theologians
Historians of Puritanism
1830 births
1922 deaths
English male non-fiction writers